Oscar Arroyo was a public official and politician in Louisiana. He served as Secretary of State of Louisiana from 1884 to 1888. He was a Democrat, Catholic, and of Spanish ancestry.

References

External links
Findagrave entry

Year of birth missing
Year of death missing
Secretaries of State of Louisiana
Louisiana Democrats
American people of Spanish descent